Liaogongzhuang station is a station on Line 6 of the Beijing Subway. The station is located at the junction of Tiancun Road and Jushan Road in Haidian District. It was opened on December 30, 2018.

Station layout 
The station has an underground island platform.

Exits 
There are 3 exits, lettered A, B, and D. Exit D is accessible.

References

External links 
 Beijing Subway official map, showing official English name

Beijing Subway stations in Haidian District
Railway stations in China opened in 2018